Door of No Return may refer to:

 Door of No Return, Gorée at the House of Slaves in Senegal
 Door of No Return, Ouidah in Benin

See also
 Door of Return